Thomas Brown  (9 January 17782 April 1820) was a Scottish philosopher and poet.

Biography

Early life 
Brown was born at Kirkmabreck, Kirkcudbrightshire, the son of Rev. Samuel Brown (died 1779) (minister of Kirkmabreck and Kirkdale) and Mary Smith.

Their son was a wide reader and an eager student. Educated at several schools in London, he went to the University of Edinburgh in 1792, where he attended Dugald Stewart's moral philosophy class, but does not appear to have completed his course. After studying law for a time he took up medicine; his graduation thesis De Somno was well received. But his strength lay in metaphysical analysis.

Career 
Brown set an answer to the objections raised against the appointment of Sir John Leslie to the mathematical professorship (1805). Leslie, a follower of David Hume, was attacked by the clerical party as a sceptic and an infidel, and Brown took the opportunity to defend Hume's doctrine of causality as in no way inimical to religion. His defence, at first only a pamphlet, became in its third edition a lengthy treatise entitled Inquiry into the Relation of Cause and Effect, and is a fine specimen of Brown's analytical faculty.

In 1806, Brown became a medical practitioner in partnership with James Gregory (1753–1821), but, though successful, preferred literature and philosophy. After twice failing to gain a professorship in the university, he was invited, during an illness of Dugald Stewart in the session of 1808–1809, to act as his substitute, and during the following session he undertook much of Stewart's work. The students received him with enthusiasm, due partly to his splendid rhetoric and partly to the novelty and ingenuity of his views. In 1810 he was appointed as colleague to Stewart, a position which he held for the rest of his life.  Brown was elected a member of the American Antiquarian Society in 1815. He wrote his lectures at high pressure, and devoted much time to the editing and publication of the numerous poems which he had written at various times during his life. He was also preparing an abstract of his lectures as a handbook for his class. His health, never strong, gave way under the strain of his work.

He was advised to take a trip to London, where he died in 1820 aged 42. His body was returned to Kirkmabreck for burial.

Criticism of Erasmus Darwin 
One of Brown's notable works included a critique of Erasmus Darwin's theory of transmutation. The philosopher published it in the form of a detailed study Observations on the zoonomia of Erasmus Darwin (1798), which was recognized as a mature work of criticism.

There, Brown wrote:

Noteworthy, Brown's criticism of the Darwinian thesis, like that of Rudolf Virchow, did not come from any religious feeling. In fact, Brown's critique bears an uncanny resemblance to Thomas Robert Malthus's Essay on the Principle of Population (1798) in which Malthus's main objection against Darwin's thesis, like that of Brown, was epistemological rather than religious.

Reception 
Brown's philosophy occupies an intermediate place between the earlier Scottish school and the later associational psychology, to which he really belonged. Later criticism of Brown's philosophy lessened its popularity, a severe attack being made by Sir William Hamilton, 9th Baronet in his Discussions and Lectures on Metaphysics. A high estimate of his merits was shown in John Stuart Mill's Examination of Hamilton. Also, in David Welsh's Account of the Life and Writings (1825) and James McCosh's Scottish Philosophy. Friedrich Eduard Beneke, who found in him anticipations of some of his own doctrines.

The philosopher Schopenhauer wrote of him in 1844:

Quite recently Thomas Brown has taught ... in his extremely tedious book Inquiry into the Relation of Cause and Effect (4th ed., 1835), ... that knowledge springs from an innate, intuitive, and instinctive conviction; he is therefore essentially on the right path. However, the crass ignorance is unpardonable by which, in this book of 476 pages, 130 of which are devoted to the refutation of Hume, no mention at all is made of Kant, who cleared up the matter seventy years ago.|The World as Will and Representation, Vol. II, Chapter IV

In his On the Fourfold Root of the Principle of Sufficient Reason, § 20, Schopenhauer claimed that Brown intended to provide support for the Cosmological Proof of God's Existence. "… sometimes there is an intention…a theological design flirting with the Cosmological Proof…. We find the clearest instance of this in Thomas Browne's [sic] book, On the Relation of Cause and Effect…this Englishman rightly recognizes, that the causal law has invariably to do with changes, and that every effect is accordingly a change. Yet…he is unwilling to admit that every cause is likewise a change and that the whole process is therefore nothing but the uninterrupted connection of changes succeeding one another in time. On the contrary, he persists in clumsily calling the cause an object or substance, which precedes the change…in order that his definition may on no account stand in the way of the Cosmological Proof…."

His friend and biographer, David Welsh (1793–1845), superintended the publication of Brown's text-book, the Physiology of the Human Mind, and his Lectures on the Philosophy of the Human Mind, which was published by his successors, John Stewart and Edward Milroy. The Lectures were well received both in England (where it reached a 19th edition) and in the USA.

Among Brown's  poems, which were influenced by Alexander Pope and Akenside were: Paradise of Coquettes (1814); Wanderer in Norway (1815); Warfiend (1816); Bower of Spring (1817); Agnes (1818); Emily (1819); a collected edition in 4 vols. appeared in 1820. His poetry, though graceful, lacked force, and is now forgotten.

Brown was one of the first contributors to the Edinburgh Review. In its second number, he published a criticism of Immanuel Kant's philosophy, based on Auguste Villiers de l'Isle-Adam's account of it.

See also
 Associationism
 James Braid (surgeon)

References 

1778 births
1820 deaths
Philosophers of mind
Scottish philosophers
19th-century Scottish medical doctors
Alumni of the University of Edinburgh
People from Dumfries and Galloway
Metaphysicians
People of the Scottish Enlightenment
Academics of the University of Edinburgh
Fellows of the Royal Society of Edinburgh
Members of the American Antiquarian Society